Lewis Benedict (September 2, 1817 – April 9, 1864) was a politician in New York State and later fought in the American Civil War. He served as a Union colonel and was awarded the rank of brevet brigadier general after his death in the Battle of Pleasant Hill.

Career
Before the American Civil War, Benedict was an Albany city attorney and a New York State Assemblyman. He graduated from Williams College in 1837.

Benedict served during the Civil War as colonel of the 162nd New York Volunteer Infantry.  It was recruited under the auspices of the Metropolitan Police at New York City and was part of the Metropolitan Brigade. He was captured at Williamsburg, Virginia, and spent months in various Confederate prisons.

Benedict fought the Siege of Port Hudson in 1863, and was killed in action in April 1864 at the Battle of Pleasant Hill, Louisiana.  On March 13, 1865, he was posthumously brevetted brigadier general, U.S. Volunteers for "gallant conduct at Port Hudson, Louisiana".

References

Bibliography
Howard, William F. "Col. Lewis Benedict: The Forgotten Hero of Pleasant Hill". The Kepi. April–May 1985.
Joiner, Gary D. Through the Howling Wilderness: The 1864 Red River Campaign and Union Failure in the West. Knoxville: University of Tennessee Press, 2006. 
Mayeux, Steven M. Earthen Walls, Iron Men: Fort DeRussy, Louisiana, and the Defense of Red River. Knoxville: University of Tennessee Press, 2007. 
A Memorial of Brevet Brigadier General Lewis Benedict, colonel of 162nd regiment N.Y.V., who fell in battle at Pleasant Hill, La., April 9, 1864. Albany, N.Y.:1866. Available online at: www.archive.org/details/memorialofbrevet00bene 
New York Infantry. 162d Regiment, 1862–1865. An historical sketch of the 162d Regiment N.Y. Vol. Infantry : (3d Metropolital Guard), 19th Army Corps, 1862-1865. Albany, NY: Weed, Parsons and Co, 1867. 

1817 births
1864 deaths
Union Army colonels
People of New York (state) in the American Civil War
Williams College alumni
American Civil War prisoners of war
Union military personnel killed in the American Civil War